Amma is a unreleased multilingual Indian film written and directed by Faisal Saif, and produced by C. R. Manohar under the banner of Tanvi Films. Filmed in Hindi and Kannada, the film is Sandalwood star Ragini Dwivedi's second film to be launched on her birthday after Ragini IPS.

Cast

 Ragini Dwivedi as Jaya
 Prashant Narayanan as C.B.I Officer Deven Bharti
 Rajpal Yadav as Radhe Krishna Yadav a.k.a. Doosri Radha
 Kavita Radheshyam as Shweta Khatri
 Pooja Misrra as Aruna Sharma
 Hamsa Prathap
 Gokul
 Aanjjan Srivastav as Minister Dhanaji Rao
 C.R Gopi as Inspector Raghavan Shastry 
 Baby Dattashree as Paree

Production and promotion
Director Faisal Saif launched the film at Om Shakti Temple Bengaluru on Ragini Dwivedi's birthday. Rajpal Yadav was signed for the main antagonist. Actress Roopa Nataraj, who rose to fame with Miss Mallige, was signed for the role of a cop but later replaced by Pooja Misrra. After filming her portions, Pooja Misrra also walked out of the film, creating controversy regarding her small role in the film. Actor Prashant Narayanan, of Murder 2 fame, was signed on to play the male lead in the film; he said: "I've always been picky about my films. What drew me to this was director Faisal Saif's script. It touches upon many aspects that are relevant to today's times".

During director Faisal Saif's creative sessions with veteran filmmaker Rituparno Ghosh while he was directing Chitrangada: The Crowning Wish in 2012, Saif discussed having a transgender antagonist dealing their gender identity with Ghosh, something which he later incorporated in this film. The character is played by Rajpal Yadav.

First look
The first look trailer and poster of the film has been released. A photo shoot was held in Mumbai where Ragini Dwivedi tested different looks for her character.

Soundtrack

References

External links 

Unreleased Hindi-language films
Unreleased Kannada-language films
Indian multilingual films
Transgender-related films
Films directed by Faisal Saif
Indian LGBT-related films